Darío Damián Figueroa  (born 13 February 1978 in San Rafael, Mendoza) is an Argentine-born Venezuelan retired footballer.

Club career
Figueroa began his playing career in 1996 with River Plate. After only four appearances in the Primera División Argentina he joined Quilmes  of the 2nd division, he also played for Aldosivi and Ferro Carril Oeste in the lower leagues of Argentine football.

In 2003, Figueroa resurrected his playing career in Venezuela. He played for UA Maracaibo between 2003 and 2008, also Darío Figueroa is one of the historics goalscorers of Maracaibo with 26 goals, after of Daniel Arismendi (31 goals), Cristian Cásseres (34 goals) and Guillermo Beraza (38).

In 2009, he joined Caracas FC where he scored a number of goals to help the club win their group and qualify for the knockout stages of Copa Libertadores 2009. Darío Figueroa currently is one of idols of Caracas

Club statistics

Honours

Club
River Plate
 Torneo Apertura: 1997

Maracaibo
 Venezuelan Primera División: 2004–05

Caracas
 Venezuelan Primera División (2): 2008–09, 2009–10
 Copa Venezuela: 2009

External links
 ESPN profile
 odn.ne.jp 
 BDFA profile 
 Argentine Primera statistics  

1978 births
Living people
Sportspeople from Mendoza Province
Argentine footballers
Argentine expatriate footballers
Expatriate footballers in Venezuela
Expatriate footballers in Colombia
Expatriate footballers in Japan
J1 League players
Argentine Primera División players
Venezuelan Primera División players
Yokohama F. Marinos players
Club Atlético River Plate footballers
Quilmes Atlético Club footballers
Aldosivi footballers
Ferro Carril Oeste footballers
UA Maracaibo players
Deportes Quindío footballers
Caracas FC players
Deportivo La Guaira players
Zamora FC players
Argentine expatriate sportspeople in Japan
Argentine expatriate sportspeople in Venezuela
Argentine expatriate sportspeople in Colombia
Association football midfielders